The ALCO Century 855 was a model of  diesel-electric locomotive built in 1964 by the American Locomotive Company for the Union Pacific Railroad. The locomotive was notable for being ALCO's most powerful diesel-electric locomotive and, at the time, the most powerful diesel locomotive ever built, being surpassed by the  EMD DDA40X in April 1969.

The Century 855 was designed and built specifically for Union Pacific, which was in need of very high horsepower locomotives for its Overland Route through the Rocky Mountains. Despite its impressive power output, all three examples of the class were scrapped by early 1972 due to mechanical unreliability.

History
The C855 rode on four two-axle trucks, grouped in pairs linked by span bolsters, giving a wheel arrangement of B+B-B+B.  The trucks and bolsters were similar to those under UP's earlier turbine locomotives. Only two A units and one B unit were built, all for the Union Pacific Railroad, which had also requested double-engined locomotives from EMD and GE in order to replace the turbines, which had become uneconomical to operate.

Union Pacific also wished to reduce the number of locomotives needed on a consist, to keep in line with their allowable gross weight limit. By consolidating several locomotives into one or two, this allowed them to lower the axle load on the rails, but to stay within the limits placed by the company. They spent their lives in the general freight pool at North Platte; however, constant shutting down due to overheating & poor performance with its twin prime movers led to their early retirement and eventual scrapping by February 1972, after only being in service for less than eight years.

See also
 List of ALCO diesel locomotives
 ALCO DH643

References

Century 855
Diesel-electric locomotives of the United States
B+B-B+B locomotives
Union Pacific Railroad locomotives
Railway locomotives introduced in 1964
Locomotives with cabless variants
Scrapped locomotives
Freight locomotives
Standard gauge locomotives of the United States
(Bo'Bo')(Bo'Bo') locomotives